The single mixed relay competition at the Biathlon World Championships 2019 was held on 14 March 2019.

Results
The race was started at 17:10.

References

Single mixed relay